Yevhen Izdebskyi (born 3 June 1995) is a Ukrainian football defender.

Career
Izdebskyi is a product of FC Krystal and FC Metalurh youth sportive school systems. His first trainers were I. Zhosan, Ihor Paskhal, Oleksandr Chornyavskyi (in FC Podillya) and Oleksandr Rudyka (in FC Metalurh).

Made his debut for FC Metalurh in the match against FC Zorya Luhansk on 7 November 2015 in the Ukrainian Premier League.

References

External links
 Profile at FFU Official Site (Ukr)
 

1995 births
Living people
Ukrainian footballers
FC Metalurh Zaporizhzhia players
FC Enerhiya Nova Kakhovka players
Ukrainian Premier League players
Sportspeople from Kherson
Association football defenders